Juraj Šimboch (born 30 January 1992) is a Slovak ice hockey goaltender. He is currently a free agent.

He participated at the 2012 World Junior Ice Hockey Championships as a member of the Slovakia men's national junior ice hockey team.

References

1992 births
Living people
HK Nitra players
HC Oceláři Třinec players
HC Berounští Medvědi players
LHK Jestřábi Prostějov players
HC ZUBR Přerov players
HC Frýdek-Místek players
GKS Katowice (ice hockey) players
Slovak ice hockey goaltenders
Slovak expatriate sportspeople in Poland
Expatriate ice hockey players in Poland
Slovak expatriate ice hockey players in the Czech Republic